Aamir Uddin Ahmod is a Bangladesh Nationalist Party politician and the former Member of Parliament of Kishoreganj-6.

Career
Ahmod was elected to parliament from Kishoreganj-6 as a Bangladesh Nationalist Party candidate in 1991.

References

Bangladesh Nationalist Party politicians
Living people
5th Jatiya Sangsad members
Year of birth missing (living people)